Majayjay, officially the Municipality of Majayjay,  is a 4th class municipality in the province of Laguna, Philippines. According to the 2020 census, it has a population of 27,893 people.

It is located at the foot of Mount Banahaw, and stands 1,000 feet above sea level. One hundred twenty kilometers south of Manila, it is bounded by the municipality of Magdalena on the north-west, by Lucban in Quezon province on the southeast, by Luisiana on the north-east, and by Liliw on the west. 
Majayjay has the Taytay Falls, also called the Majayjay Falls or Imelda Falls, because ex-First Lady Imelda Marcos financed the promotion of tourism in this place. It is a two-storey high falls located in a remote scenery where the forestry is abundant. To reach Taytay Falls, one has to go down the stone steps leading to a kilometer-long trail. Constructed in 2008, during the past, reaching Taytay Falls is a very hard task, as there were no marked trails during that time. Recently, the World Bank has sponsored the promotion of tourism in Taytay Falls.

History
It called Majayjay because it is a mountain place. And, the people is saying hay hay. And it become Majayjay
Indigenous residents use to call it Malay Barangay. The Spanish colonial government made it a town in 1571

During this period, Malay Barangay was one of the most populated settlements in the newly founded province. It competed with Bay and Pagsanjan during the selection of the province's capital.

The popularity of this new town grew instantly during the Spanish period. Its location at the foot of the mountain gave it an abundant supply of fresh mountain spring water. Four rivers flowed through the town. They were Initian, Oobi and Ula, from the towering mountain, and Balanac from the falls of Botocan where all the three rivers meet.

Botocan Falls and the town's scenery were uniquely famous. Europeans and wealthy natives from Manila frequently visited the town. However, the road to Malay Barangay was tough. Guests have to be ferried from Manila through the Pasig River to Laguna de Bay. Land travel began by mounting on horses through a path in the forest, and then borne by natives in hammocks on the way up to Malay Barangay.

As to how Malay Barangay got its name Majayjay, residents assume that Spaniards found it difficult to pronounce Malay Barangay. Early colonizers may have shortened it to Malay-ay, until it became Majayjay. Legends, however say that it was the difficult journey to Majayjay, which gave the town its name. Tired travelers sighed, “Hay!” after scaling a cliff, “Hay!” after ascending a hill, and “Hay!” after crossing a raging river. Thus, guests referred to the place “Mahayhay,” meaning, many sighs. Spaniards spelled it “Majayjay.”

Immediately after the conversion of the natives of Malay Barangay, a makeshift church was built near May-it River. Fire destroyed it in 1578. Believers built a new church made of bamboo and cogon thatch to refurbish the former. However, fire again razed it to the ground. This time, the faithful built a stone church, but it again smoldered to ashes. The residents wondered. In spite of the repeated incidents of fire, the image of their Patron Saint, San Gregorio Papa Magno remained miraculously unscathed.

Through the efforts of Padre José de Puertollano, contributions enforced from parishioners, and forced labor of the natives, a new elegant church rose in Majayjay. It took nineteen years, incalculable donations and countless lash marks that scarred the backs of languid natives to finish the church. The church's completion in 1730 put it in the list of the most elegant churches in the province.

Geography

Majayjay is geographically a landlocked area situated in the southernmost part of the province of Laguna. It nestles at the foot of the mystical Mt. Banahaw, and due to its higher altitude at some 2,700+ ft above sea level, the town makes for a good vacation destination during summer season in the Philippines. It was once branded as the Summer Capital of the Philippines 300–400 years ago during Spanish era where most of the huge names in the Spanish colonial Philippines visited this humble place. Other sights along the streets are the remnants of the said era for Spanish-inspired houses still stand at random key locations mostly in the town square. Famous and affluent families then still have their ancestral houses maintained.

Climate
Majayjay has a tropical climate. There is significant rainfall in most months of the year. The short dry season has little effect on the overall climate. This location is classified as Am by Köppen and Geiger. The temperature here averages 25.8 °C. The average annual rainfall is 2571 mm. The warmest month of the year is May, with an average temperature of 27.4 °C. January has the lowest average temperature of the year. It is 24.2 °C. The difference in precipitation between the driest month and the wettest month is 332 mm. During the year, the average temperatures vary by 3.2 °C.

Barangays

Majayjay is politically subdivided into 40 barangays.

Demographics

Economy 

The town boasts line of shanties of budding small enterprises mostly selling indigenous farm crops along its main road.

Tourism

1. Saint Gregory the Great Parish Church Majayjay is home to one of the oldest Roman Catholic churches in the Philippines, the Saint Gregory the Great Parish Church. It was built in 1575 through forced labor to the town folks. Inside the church are antique statues of saints brought by the Spaniards in the early era of propagating Christianity. It is somehow true to every church built in the country that it experienced arson (1576, 1606 and 1660) but later undergone reconstructions and rehabilitation works. Atop the roof of the church is seen the scenic view of Laguna de Bay.

2. Taytay Falls Majayjay is also home to the Taytay Falls. Others call it the Majayjay Falls or even Imelda Falls, because ex-First Lady Imelda Marcos financed the promotion of tourism in this place. It is a two-storey high falls located in a remote scenery where the forestry is abundant. To reach Taytay Falls, one has to go down the stone steps leading to a kilometer-long trail. Recently, the World Bank has sponsored the promotion of tourism in Taytay Falls.

3. Dalitiwan Resort Dalitiwan Resort is well known for being a running water-typed resort showcasing icy cold water flowing from Mount Banahaw springs. It is located in barangay Ilayang Banga. To get there, you'll have to ride a jeep or a trike for 3 minutes or so from the town proper going far down the area before ascending to the zigzag road.

4. Costales Nature Farm Costales Nature Farm is well known for its unique way of cultivating agricultural and farm products. Through the organic farming that was first introduced in Majayjay it became a boom and a success. Many people who are after to doing the same technique usually visit the farm located in Barangay Gagalot.

5. Coconut Arrack Commonly called Lambanog. This lambanog is a liquor produced from the extracted Tuba, a sap that is gotten from the coconut tree. However, as you pass along the National Highways, you can probably see Mangangarit skillfully climbing the tree and gliding all the way from one tree to another by the use of two bamboo logs horizontally knotted. There are several stores selling this type of wine, for you to experience its taste just visit the town.

6. Puente de Capriccio In Rizal's El Filibusterismo, he spoke of an old Spanish bridge made of stone in the year 1851. It was a one-arch bridge since it was not finished, early natives put bamboo footbridge to connect the opposite sides to make accessible. Puente de Capriccio was initiated by Spanish franciscan priest Victoriano del Moral. But the priest was cruel and autocratic, anyone who do not labor in the construction would be later punish by whipping the buttocks. The workers were reportedly not paid a single centavo. Because of his cruelty, the workers campaigned against him, thus, the bridge's construction never resumed since 1851. The bridge is still standing firm today crossing the Olla River. It is called Tulay ng Pige (Bridge of Buttocks) by modern Majayjayenos. The bridge now symbolizes the defiance of Filipino workers against the oppressive Spanish colonialists during the colonial period.

7. Mount Banahaw The town of Majayjay is located at the foot of this majestic mountain. In the early Spanish era, Mount Banahaw was called Monte de Majayjay, because it was the town the only way to travel to the mountain. Many European elites visited the town because of its fresh air and the scenic view of Mount Banahaw.

8. Carayan Resort A resort right at the heart of Majayjay, Laguna, foothills near Mt. Banahaw situated in Barangay Panglan, Majayjay, Laguna - Philippines.

9. Scenic View Resort and Restaurant Located in brgy. Ilayang Banga.

10. APA Farms

11. Hillarion's Heritage Farm

12. Bukal Falls Popular to most tourists as the Enchanted Falls

13. Botocan Hydroelectric Power Plant and Dam It is the first hydroelectric power plant ever constructed in the Philippines in the 20th century (1930). It is now owned by the CBK Power Company Limited.

14. Ermita Church Then, a tribunal. This holy place houses the image of Nuestra Senora dela Porteria.

15. Our Lady of the Gate Grotto Situated along the Olla riverbank is sacred place where masses at times are being held. It is a small tourist destination for religious excursionist.

Culture

Festivals

Majayjay Day is celebrated every year on October 2 as part of the celebration of the founding anniversary of the town. It brags off farm and agricultural products produced primarily from the 40 barangays composing it. This day has been given a new life and breathing in its new brand name as AniLinang Festival. The 1st AniLinang Festival was held on October 2, 2016, as an initiative of the local government to promote the town's laid-back, and peaceful way of life seen in its agricultural produce as well as in their indigenous cuisines.

SaGreMa Festival (San Gregorio Magno Majayjay), is a parochial festivity celebrated on September 3 and March 12, the dates when Saint Gregory, the town's patron saint became a pope and the day he died, respectively. In this time of the year, the Majayjayenos honor the saint for bountiful year it has been for the town.

Transportation

Visiting the town is very accessible and convenient in all its four (4) entry points: Magdalena-Majayajay road to the north, Liliw-Majayjay road to the west, Luisiana-Majayjay road to the east, and Lucban-Majayjay road to the south. Public utility vehicles are dispersed such as the local jeepneys and tricycles based in the town center.

Infrastructure

Communication

The town of Majayjay possesses different communication lines including PLDT, and cellular communications such as Globe, and Smart. Any travelers would find this place very convenient in accessing the online, digital world during their vacation trip.

Education

Secondary schools:
 Liceo de Majayjay (High School)
 Sta Catalina National High School (Barangay San Miguel, Main Campus and Barangay Bakia, ext.)
 Suba National High School (Barangay San Isidro, Main Campus and Barangay Gagalot, ext.)

Elementary schools:
 Liceo de Majayjay (Elementary)
 Majayjay Elementary School
 Sta Catalina Elementary School
 Bakia-Botocan Elementary School
 Paaralang Elementarya ng Gagalot - Taytay
 Suba Elementary School
 Bucal Elementary School 
 Munting Kawayan Elementary School

Government

Cabinet (2022-2025)

References

External links

[ Philippine Standard Geographic Code]
Philippine Census Information
Local Governance Performance Management System

Municipalities of Laguna (province)